Tigre was a 74-gun ship of the line of the Spanish Navy, launched in 1747.

She was captured by the Royal Navy on 13 August 1762, and commissioned as the third rate HMS Tigre. She was sold out of the navy in 1783.

Notes

References

Lavery, Brian (2003) The Ship of the Line - Volume 1: The development of the battlefleet 1650-1850. Conway Maritime Press. .

Tigre (1747)
Ships of the line of the Royal Navy
1747 ships